Gardie is a commune in the Aude department in southern France.

Geography
It is a small hilltop village on the edge of the Barris stream valley. It is in the Canton of St Hilaire, 4 km away.

History
The village has Roman origins and was named Gardiaco. It was probably built as a guardpost for the nearby St Hilaire Abbey.

The centre of the village has a Circulade, a circle of old houses that would have originally been built around the perimeter of the now missing chateau as a defensive feature. It was possible to circumvent the village through the attics of these houses. The church has a small tower topped by a cast iron frame cap and bells.

Population

Economy
Gardie is a farming village with the main crop being grapes.  Most of the grapes go to produce the famous Blanquette de Limoux or Limoux A.O.C. red wine.

See also
Communes of the Aude department

References

Communes of Aude